John Gerrard or Gerard may refer to:

John Gerard (c. 1545–1612), English herbalist
John Gerard (Jesuit) (1564–1637), English Jesuit priest
John Gerard (Royalist) (1632–1654), Royalist during the English Civil War
John Gerrard (1720–1787), American Baptist preacher and church founder, after whom Gerrardstown, West Virginia is named
John Gerrard (police officer) (1920–2003), British police officer
Jon Gerrard (born 1947), Canadian politician and doctor
John M. Gerrard (born 1953), American judge
John Gerrard (artist) (born 1974), Irish artist

See also